Trichotolinum is a genus of flowering plants belonging to the family Brassicaceae.

Its native range is Southern Argentina.

Species:
 Trichotolinum deserticola (Speg.) O.E.Schulz

References

Brassicaceae
Brassicaceae genera